RiverBend Alternative Education School, also known as Riverbend Youth Accountability Camp and RiverBend High School, is an alternative high school in La Grande, Oregon, United States. It is located at a juvenile correctional facility operated by the Oregon Youth Authority.

Academics
In 2008, 11% of the school's seniors received a high school diploma. Of 35 students, four graduated, 18 dropped out, two received a modified diploma, and 11 were still in high school the following year.

References

High schools in Union County, Oregon
La Grande, Oregon
Alternative schools in Oregon
Public high schools in Oregon